Ras-related protein Rap-2a is a protein that in humans is encoded by the RAP2A gene. RAP2A is a member of the Ras-related protein family.

Interactions 

RAP2A has been shown to interact with RUNDC3A, RASSF5 and RALGDS.

References

Further reading